, also known as , is a Japanese manga series written and illustrated by Natsume Ono, detailing the daily lives of the staff of a restaurant in Rome. The first iteration of the series was serialized in Ohta Publishing's Manga Erotics F manga magazine between May 2005 and March 2006; it spanned one volume. A continuation, was serialized in the same magazine from September 2006 to January 2009. An anime adaptation, produced by David Production, aired on Fuji TV's late night Noise programming block from April to June 2009. The anime was also officially streamed with English subtitles by Crunchyroll. Both manga series, Ristorante Paradiso and Gente, have been licensed by Viz Media for an English-language release in North America.

Characters

The protagonist of the series. 21 years old, Nicoletta is an energetic girl whose parents divorced when she was young and was as a result raised by her grandparents. Upon graduating from cooking school, she began working as an apprentice at the Casetta dell'Orso restaurant and is its only female staff. She has a crush on Claudio.

The head waiter of Casetta dell'Orso. He and his first wife Gabriella separated a few years previous to the start of the series. He still wears his wedding ring to dissuade women from pursuing him.

A waiter at Casetta dell'Orso. A very blunt but occasionally shy person. He is a widower, but still cares deeply for his departed wife, and ignores the advances of other women. He has a daughter, Rosemary, and a grandson, Francesco.

A waiter at Casetta dell'Orso. A very jovial person, he is married to a young woman who is a college student, whom he met through their mutual workout routines. He is a very flirtatious man, but openly reveals that he is already married and very much in love.

The sommelier at Casetta dell'Orso. A taciturn person, he is Lorenzo's half brother and cousin. Gigi rarely speaks, but by observing people, is able to tell what they are thinking, including perfectly matching one's taste with a wine. He is currently single.

A chef. A friendly person. He is a devoted husband to his wife, Angela. He and Claudio previously worked in a hotel together when they were much younger.

A chef. The youngest member of the restaurant staff; he is a talented pasty chef.

Nicoletta's mother. A sought-after divorce lawyer in Rome. She left Nicoletta with her grandmother at a young age so that she could get re-married.

Claudio's ex-wife. A lawyer who works in the same office as Olga; they are best friends, and is the only person Olga tells that Nicoletta is her daughter.

Olga's current husband and owner of Casetta dell'Orso. 51 years old.

A former chef of Casetta dell'Orso. She left to live in America with her family a few years previous to the start of the series. Teo looks up to her as a mentor.

Anime television series
The Ristorante Paradiso anime adaptation aired on Fuji TV's late night Noise programming block from April 5, 2009. Produced by David Production, being the studio's first anime television series production, the series aired for 11 episodes. The anime has been licensed by Right Stuf Inc. and was released under their new label Lucky Penny on November 6, 2012.

Staff
Director: Mitsuko Kase
Art director: Yasufumi Soejima
Series composition: Shinichi Inotsume
Script: Shinichi Inotsume, Megumi Sasano
Character design: Itsuko Takeda
3DCGI: Masato Taira, Takendo Kobayashi
Art settings: Junko Shimizu
Color designs: Keiko Kai, Hitomi Ikeda
Director of photography: Eiji Ueda
Sound director: Toshiki Kameyama
Music: ko-ko-ya
Editing: Kengo Shigemura
Animation production: david production
Production: Rispara Production Committee (Fuji Television, Shochiku, Movic, Yomiko Advertising, Sony PLC, Hakuhodo DY Media Partners)

Theme songs
Opening theme 
Lyrics: Tomoko Nagashima, composition and arrangement: Kazuma Fujimoto, performance: orange pekoe
Ending theme 
Lyrics: Yūho Iwasato, composition: Lisa Komine, arrangement: Rie Hamada, performance: Lisa Komine
Theme song  (episode 3 only)
Lyrics: Natsumi Kiyoura, composition: Shun Yoshida, arrangement: ko-ko-ya, performance: Natsumi Kiyoura

Episodes
Episode 1:
Nicoletta arrives at the restaurant and threatens to expose her mother's secret. She is introduced to Claudio, the restaurant staff, and Olga's new husband, Lorenzo. Olga loans a furnished apartment to Nicoletta.

Episode 2:
While searching for a job, Nicoletta runs into Luciano and his grandson. Something that the grandson says inspires her to ask Olga for a job at the restaurant. Claudio walks Nicoletta home through the rain, and she tells him that she has feelings for him. Later, Claudio's ex-wife comes to the restaurant for dinner, and Nicoletta interrupts a conversation between Claudio and his ex-wife. Nicoletta is left wondering why Claudio really wears his wedding ring.

Episode 3:
After a conversation with Luciano, Claudio begins to avoid Nicoletta. Nicoletta and Olga have a conversation about Nicoletta's feelings for Claudio, and she realizes that she is in love with him.

Episode 4:
When an old sous-chef stops by for a dinner with the owner and his wife, Nicoletta has a chance to learn a bit of the history of the Casetta dell'Orso.

Episode 5:
The owner and Gigi (the sommelier) are half-brothers, and also cousins—the owner's father had an affair with *his* brother's wife. As a result of the affair, Gigi and the owner didn't meet until they were in their twenties, when they hit it off well, and decided their fathers' feud had nothing to do with them.

Gigi observes people closely – it's how he's able to pick just the right wine for them – so he's figured out that Nicoletta is Olga's daughter.

Episode 6:
Vito (the tall, bald campiere) is a lady's man who dearly loves his wife.

Together with several of the other staff of Casetta dell'Orso, they set another young lady's man straight.

Episode 7:
Luciano's grandson has a birthday coming up, and for Luciano, the staff of Casetta dell'Orso are willing to go all out.

Episode 8:
A glimpse into Claudio's past – back when he dropped dishes all the time and spilled wine on the blouses of rich ladies. Claudio's reminisces are used as a foil for Nicoletta's dish-dropping and general unhandiness around the kitchen.

The occasion of these reflections is the arrival of Angela, the wife of Furio the head chef. Angela was the daughter of the hotel-owner where Claudio got his start – Furio was a chef there who showed Claudio some kindness.

Angela arrives with the hotel manager who fired Claudio. The manager, who has retired, but is in town for a visit, does not recognize Claudio, and is terrifically impressed with Claudio, wondering where he learned such skills as a waiter.

Episode 9:
The heating is broken, so the restaurant is closed. It's not empty, though – the kitchen staff are trying out dishes for the spring menu, with Nicoletta trying to scrape together something palatable. Reflections on Teo's tumultuous past with Vanna. Again, foils for Nicoletta. Just as Teo is dismissive of Nicoletta's skills as a cook, Vanna was dismissive of Teo.

Episode 10:
A comparison between Luciano (who rejects the advances of a woman, because he has not forgotten his dead wife), and Claudio (who cannot let go of his love for his ex-wife).

Mixed in: Gabriella, Claudio's ex, keeps coming to the restaurant. Nicoletta confronts her, telling her it is cruel to come so often, since she knows how Claudio feels.

Episode 11:
The conclusion of the arc begun in episode 10. Luciano tells Claudio directly that it is time he removed his wedding ring.

Olga's birthday. Nicoletta bakes her a cake. Olga is so moved, and moved by the events surrounding Claudio and his wife – who is Olga's business partner – that she confesses that Nicoletta is her daughter. Lorenzo tells her he has known since Nicoletta started work at the Casetta dell'Orso: Nicoletta and Olga have the same smile.

The series ends with Nicoletta noticing that Claudio no longer wears his wedding ring.

References

External links
 Official anime website 
 

2005 manga
David Production
Noise (TV programming block)
Ohta Publishing manga
Romance anime and manga
Cooking in anime and manga
Viz Media manga